Plačkovica is a mountain located the eastern part of North Macedonia, it extends between the cities of Radoviš, and Vinica. 

The highest peak is Lisec at 1,754 m, the length of main valley slopes of the peak Lisec is 34 km. The valley of Zrnovska river splits the mountain in two, eastern and western parts. The peak of the western part is Turtel at 1,689 m. Lisec is a popular climbing route for the local climbers, being one of the harder peaks to scale in this part of Macedonia. It is not unusual to have snow on the peak during the month of June. The peak is served by two mountain lodges: Vrteška from Štip's side and, Dzumaja from Radoviš's side.

Geological components of Plačkovica are mainly granite and marble.

References

Mountains of North Macedonia
Rhodope mountain range